The 2013 Meath Intermediate Football Championship is the 87th edition of the Meath GAA's premier club Gaelic football tournament for intermediate graded teams in County Meath, Ireland. The tournament consists of 16 teams, with the winner going on to represent Meath in the Leinster Intermediate Club Football Championship. The championship starts with a group stage and then progresses to a knock out stage.

The draw for the group stages of the championship were made on 11 February 2013 with the games commencing on the weekend of 12 April 2013.

Ratoath returned to the middle grade for the first time since 2007 after securing the J.F.C. crown last year, their fourth period as an Intermediate side. Donaghmore/Ashbourne's second string joined them after finishing as J.F.C. runners-up last year. This was the first time that the Ashbourne club had a second team in the Intermediate grade.

No team was relegated from the Senior grade to the Intermediate grade.

On 13 October 2013, Gaeil Colmcille claimed their 2nd Intermediate championship title when they defeated Clann na nGael 0-18 to 0-5, succeeding Na Fianna as Intermediate champions.

There was no relegation from this grade in 2013.

Team changes
The following teams have changed division since the 2012 championship season.

From I.F.C.
Promoted to I.F.C.
 Na Fianna  -  (Intermediate Champions)

To I.F.C.
Promoted from 2012 Meath Junior Football Championship
 Ratoath - (Junior 'A' Champions)
 Donaghmore/Ashbourne 'B' - (Junior 'A' Runner-Up)

Participating teams
The teams taking part in the 2013 Meath Intermediate Football Championship are:

Intermediate championship proposals
 2013: In the 2013 Intermediate championship, there will be 16 teams of one groups of 6 teams and two groups of 5 teams. There will once again be no relegation to the Junior championship and one team will be promoted to the Senior championship. One team will be relegated from Senior to Intermediate and the Junior championship finalists will be promoted, leaving 18 Intermediate teams for the start of the 2014 campaign.
 2014: Three groups of 6 teams with the top 3 from each group qualifying for the knock-out stages.

Group stage

There are 3 groups called Group A,B and C. The top team in Group A qualifies for a Semi-final. The 2nd and 3rd teams in Group A along with the two top finishers in Group B and C will qualify for the Quarter-finals stage of the tournament. The draw for the group stages of the championship were made on 11 February 2013.

Group A

Round 1
 St. Ultans      1-3, 0-13  St. Michael's , Carnaross, 12/4/2013,
 Clann na nGael  0-7, 0-7  Carnaross,     Moylagh,   13/4/2013,
 Syddan          1-8, 1-13  Dunderry,      Kilberry,  14/4/2013,

Round 2
 Dunderry     1-9, 0-8  St. Ultan's,              Kells,       28/4/2013,
 St. Michael's   0-8, 0-10 Clann na nGael,        Cortown,     28/4/2013,
 Carnaross       0-12, 0-14  Syddan,                   Meath Hill,  4/5/2013,

Round 3
 Clann na nGael  1-6, 0-10  St. Ultan's,                  Trim,        31/5/2013,
 Carnaross       1-4, 0-11  Dunderry,                  Millbrook,    1/6/2013,
 St. Michael's   0-11, 2-11  Syddan,                   Drumconrath,  3/6/2013,

Round 4
 St. Ultan's  1-13, 2-9  Carnaross,                    Kilmainham,   15/8/2013,
 Syddan          0-10, 1-9  Clann na nGael,            Kilmainham,   18/8/2013,
 Dunderry        0-6, 0-7  St. Michael's,              Simonstown,   18/8/2013,

Round 5
 St. Michael's   1-12, 0-6  Carnaross,                 Meath Hill,   30/8/2013,
 Clann na nGael  1-9, 1-8   Dunderry,                  Cortown,      30/8/2013,
 St. Ultan's     0-9, 0-8   Syddan,                    Carlanstown,  30/8/2013,

Group B

Round 1
 St. Colmcille's           1-10, 0-9  Gaeil Colmcille,          Simonstown,  14/4/2013,
 Trim                      1-11, 0-12 Longwood,                 Summerhill,  20/4/2013,
 Donaghmore/Ashbourne 'B'   -    Bye

Round 2
 Donaghmore/Ashbourne 'B'  1-7, 2-10  St. Colmcille's,          Stamullen,     23/4/2013,
 Gaeil Colmcille        1-12, 0-8  Trim,                     Simonstown,    26/4/2013,
 Longwood                   -    Bye

Round 3
 Trim                      0-11, 2-11  Donaghmore/Ashbourne B,  Dunderry,      3/6/2013,
 Longwood                  0-10, 3-5  Gaeil Colmcille,          Dunderry,      5/7/2013,
 St. Colmcille's            -    Bye

Round 4
 St. Colmcille's        0-14, 1-9   Trim,                       Ratoath,       17/8/2013,
 Donaghmore/Ashbourne 'B' 2-7, 1-8  Longwood,                   Ratoath,       17/8/2013,
 Gaeil Colmcille            -     Bye

Round 5
 Longwood                  scr, w/o   St. Colmcille's,          Dunsany,              31/8/2013,
 Gaeil Colmcille        1-11, 2-4  Donaghmore/Ashbourne 'B',    Pairc Tailteann,  31/8/2013,
 Trim                       -     Bye

Group C

Round 1
 Castletown      3-5, 3-9  Ratoath,        Skryne,   14/4/2013 
 Ballivor        0-14, 3-9  Ballinlough,    Kells,    20/4/2013  
 Ballinabrackey   -    Bye

Round 2
 Ballinabrackey  0-8, 1-7  Castletown,      Trim,     20/4/2013,
 Ratoath     0-16, 1-9  Ballivor,                  Bective,  25/4/2013,
 Ballinlough      -    Bye

Round 3
 Ballinlough     0-6, 2-11  Ratoath,                Castletown,   31/5/2013,
 Ballivor        0-6, 0-12  Ballinabrackey,         Boardsmill,    2/6/2013,            
 Castletown       -    Bye

Round 4
 Ballinabrackey  2-9, 0-9  Ballinlough,             Kildalkey,     17/8/2013,
 Castletown      3-17, 0-5 Ballivor,                Athboy,        18/8/2013,
 Ratoath          -    Bye

Round 5
 Ballinlough     0-9, 1-11  Castletown,             Carnaross,     27/8/2013,
 Ratoath      2-9, 0-11  Ballinabrackey,            Longwood,      27/8/2013,
 Ballivor        -vs-  Bye.

Finals
The top team in Group A qualifies for a Semi-final. The 2nd and 3rd teams in Group A along with the two top finishers in Group B and C will qualify for the Quarter-finals stage of the tournament.

Quarter-finals:
 St. Colmcille's    1-11, 2-9    St. Michael's,    Seneschalstown,       14/9/2013,
 Ratoath            2-7,  1-12   Gaeil Colmcille,  Pairc Tailteann,  15/9/2013,
 Castletown      0-11, 0-7    Dunderry,            Simonstown,           15/9/2013,

Semi-finals:
 Clann na nGael  1-13, 1-12   St. Michael's,       Pairc Tailteann,  29/9/2013, (AET) 
 Gaeil Colmcille 2-13, 0-15   Castletown,          Pairc Tailteann,  29/9/2013,

Final:
 Clann na nGael     0-5,  0-18   Gaeil Colmcille,  Pairc Tailteann,  13/10/2013,

Leinster Intermediate Club Football Championship
Quarter-final:
 Ballyroan Abbey 2-11, 0-13 Gaeil Colmcille, Crettyard, 3/11/2013,

References

External links

Meath Intermediate Football Championship
Meath Intermediate Football Championship